Bifrenaria aureofulva is a species of orchid.

aureofulva